This page lists the winners and nominees for the Soul Train Music Quincy Jones Award for Career Achievement, awarded from 1998 to 2007. The award was originally entitled Heritage Award for Career Achievement, but was later renamed to honor former recipient Quincy Jones. The award was split on several years, including 2003, 2004 and 2006, to honor male and female artists separately.

Winners
Winners are listed first and highlighted in bold.

1990s

2000s

See also
 Soul Train Music Award for Heritage Award – Career Achievement

References

Career awards
Soul Train Music Awards